Takuji (written: 宅治, 拓児, 拓司, 拓自, 卓司, 卓治, 卓次 or 卓爾) is a masculine Japanese given name. Notable people with the name include:

, Japanese gymnast
, Japanese writer
, Japanese biologist, ethnologist and historian
, Japanese actor
, Japanese footballer
, Japanese Go player
, Japanese American activist
, Japanese politician
, Japanese footballer
, Japanese footballer

Japanese masculine given names